Georges Cogniot (15 December 1901 in Montigny-lès-Cherlieu, Haute-Saône – 12 March 1978) was a French writer, philosopher and politician of the French Communist Party.

Biography 
He was born Georges Auguste Alexandre Cogniot in to a middle class family and graduated from École normale supérieure.

A member of the French Communist Party since 1922 he was elected to its central committee in 1926. Prior to the Second World War he was elected to the French National Assembly as part of the Popular Front. He was an organizer of the World Committee Against War and Fascism and protested against the Munich Agreement. He was the representative of the PCF in the Executive Committee of the Communist International and also succeeded Paul Vaillant-Couturier as editor of L'Humanité.

In 1938 with Paul Langevin he created the Marxist journal La Pensée.

After the Nazi invasion of France he was conscripted to the army however he de mobilized for health complication. Cogniot was arrested by the German police in 1941 but managed to escape alongside other prisoners and became active in the French Resistance and was responsible for Communist Party press.

In 1944 he once again became editor of L'Humanité and was elected to the National Assembly. A close associate of Maurice Thorez, he was the first director of the Maurice Thorez Institute.

He was part of the Cultural Affairs Committee. In 1966, he was appointed member of the control commission responsible for examining the problems of orientation and selection in the public service of education.

Works
The escape Rationale Publishing, 1947
Enthusiasm to consciousness chained. The school issue in 1848 and the law Falloux Publishing Yesterday and Today, 1948
Reality of the nation, the gimmick of cosmopolitanism, Editions Sociales, 1950
A short guide sincere Soviet Union, Editions Sociales, 1954
Secularism and democratic reform of education, Social Publishing, 1963
Materialism Greco-Roman Social Publishing, 1964
What is communism?, Editions Sociales, 1964
The lyre of brass folk poetry and democratic 1815–1918, Editions Sociales, 1964
Prometheus takes knowledge, the October Revolution, culture and school Editions Sociales, 1967
Karl Marx Our Contemporary Editions Sociales, 1968
The Communist International. Historical overview, Editions Sociales, 1969
Presence of Lenin, Social Publishing, 1970
Maurice Thorez: man, activist, Victor Joannes, Editions Sociales, 1970
Bias (2 volumes), Editions Sociales, 1976
Materialism and humanism: Democritus, Epicurus, Lucretius, Goethe, Marx, Temps des Cerises, 1998

References 

1901 births
1978 deaths
People from Haute-Saône
Politicians from Bourgogne-Franche-Comté
French Communist Party politicians
Members of the 16th Chamber of Deputies of the French Third Republic
Members of the Constituent Assembly of France (1945)
Members of the Constituent Assembly of France (1946)
Deputies of the 1st National Assembly of the French Fourth Republic
Deputies of the 2nd National Assembly of the French Fourth Republic
Deputies of the 3rd National Assembly of the French Fourth Republic
French Senators of the Fifth Republic
Senators of Seine (department)
Senators of Paris
Writers from Bourgogne-Franche-Comté
20th-century French translators
20th-century French male writers
École Normale Supérieure alumni
Recipients of the Order of Friendship of Peoples
French male non-fiction writers
20th-century French philosophers